The 1975 Swiss Grand Prix was a non-championship Formula One race held on 24 August 1975 at the Dijon-Prenois racetrack in France, due to a ban on motor racing in Switzerland since the 1955 Le Mans disaster.

Jean-Pierre Jarier took pole from Emerson Fittipaldi, with Patrick Depailler and Jochen Mass on the second row, these four drivers being the only ones to lap the circuit in under a minute.

Fittipaldi's clutch slipped on the line and after 2 laps he retired completely. Jarier led from home favourite Clay Regazzoni, Depailler, Mass and John Watson. James Hunt was maintaining 6th place, despite suffering dreadful handling problems. Losing power on the corners, he soon lost position to Carlos Pace and Ronnie Peterson.

Jarier's lead had built up and he looked certain to obtain his long-awaited first Formula One victory. Gearbox drive problems thwarted him though and a bitterly disappointed Jarier retired on lap 34.

Peterson also passed Watson to take 5th before the close, leaving the order at the end as Regazzoni, Depailler, Mass, Peterson, Watson, Pace. It was the only time in the history of the Swiss Grand Prix that a Swiss driver won the race.

Classification 

Swiss Grand Prix
Swiss Grand Prix
Grand Prix
Swiss Grand Prix